Ghūlām Muḥammad Gūlāb (6 January 1958 – 18 January 2019) was a Pakistani television and film actor.  During his artistic career he starred in more than 300 Urdu and Sindhi dramas and 6 films.

Early life 
Gulab was born on 6 January 1958 in Shahmir Chandio village, Nawabshah district in an agriculturer's house.

He completed his school and intermediate education in the village. In 1976, he shifted to Karachi and got a clerk's job in the food department. In 1978, he returned to Nawabshah. He had been jailed for taking part in protests after Zulfikar Ali Bhutto's death penalty.

Career 
Gulab emerged as a television actor in early 1980s and started his career in Sindhi dramas. He entered the TV industry in 1982 and made his debut with the Sindhi drama Biyo Shaks (The Other Man). Another source states that his first drama was Khan Sahib (1980). He appeared in various plays and serials, including Sindhi dramas Talash, Saam, Jangal, Jiyapo, Mittia ja Manhoo, and Ghulam, and Urdu serials Zeenat, Rawish, Noori Jam Tamachi, Tipu Sultan, and Saagar ka Aansoo.

He was known for Noori Jam Tamachi, Marvi and Chand Grehan. He also worked in theatre plays and films, his first film was Dushman in which he played the role of an actor. He also played the leading character in another Sindhi film Muhib Sheedi (1990). He also appeared in Syed Noor's Sargam (1995).

Gulab contested the Pakistani general elections from Nawabshah and Karachi doubly but lost both times. In 2016, he joined the Pakistan Tehreek-i-Insaf.

In 2016, he was awarded the President's Pride of Performance Award for his services in art and drama.

Death 
He died in Gulshan-e-Iqbal, Karachi on 18 January 2019. Gulab was a heart patient with chronic diabetes.

References

External links
 

1958 births
2019 deaths
20th-century Pakistani male actors
21st-century Pakistani male actors
Baloch people
Male actors in Sindhi cinema
Male actors in Urdu cinema
Pakistan Tehreek-e-Insaf politicians
People from Karachi
Sindhi people
People from Shaheed Benazir Abad District
Recipients of the Pride of Performance